"Reminiscence of Marie A." or "Memory of Marie A." (German: "Erinnerung an die Marie A.") is a 1920 poem by German poet and playwright Bertold Brecht (1889-1956) that was first published in his collection Die Hauspostille (1927).  Brecht wrote the poem in his notebook on 21 February 1920 on a train to Berlin. The poem is a reminiscence of time spent with a former lover and a kiss beneath a plum tree remembered only because of the memory of a passing white cloud.

The poem's first stanza was read voice-over in the Oscar-winning 2006 German film The Lives of Others (Das Leben der Anderen), by the character of Stasi Captain Gerd Wiesler (played by Ulrich Mühe), lying back uncomfortably on his sofa:

References

Works by Bertolt Brecht
1920 poems
German poems